Brest is a village in the municipality of Čučer-Sandevo, Republic of North Macedonia.

Demographics
As of the 2021 census, Brest had 278 residents with the following ethnic composition:
Albanians 230
Persons for whom data are taken from administrative sources 48

According to the 2002 census, the village had a total of 569 inhabitants. Ethnic groups in the village include:
Albanians 564
Romani 1
Others 4

References

Villages in Čučer-Sandevo Municipality
Albanian communities in North Macedonia